() or Route 85 is a primary road in northeastern Iceland. It connects Húsavík, Tjörneshreppur, Þórshöfn, Bakkafjörður, and Vopnafjörður to the main road network.

Roads in Iceland